Under the Radar is a 2002 documentary DVD of the band Dispatch.  It also includes a bonus CD entitled "Patchwork", which includes remixes of Dispatch songs and audio recordings of some of the performances on the DVD.

Track listing

DVD
Intro
"Cover This"
Napster
"Mission"
"Two Coins"
To Begin
"Passerby"
Days Inn
"One Truth"
"Open Up"
Bearsville
"Time Served"
"Elias"
Wimpy
"Bullet Holes"
"Walk With You"
Jack Gauthier
"Bang Bang"
Lavish McTavish
"Even"
"Gasoline Dreams"
R'opera
Quigley
"Lightning"
"Prince of Spades"
"Flying Horses"
"Fat Ol' Pig"
"Mayday"
"Bats in the Belfry"
"Amazing Grace"
"The General"
Credits
Goodbye

CD: Patchwork
"Bang Bang (Remix)"
"The General (Remix)"
"One Truth"
"Gasoline Dreams"
"Mayday"
"Walk With You"
"Fat Ol' Pig"

Dispatch live albums
2002 live albums
2002 video albums
Live video albums
Direct-to-video documentary films